Matthew James Chapman (born April 28, 1993) is an American professional baseball third baseman for the Toronto Blue Jays of Major League Baseball (MLB). He previously played for the Oakland Athletics.

Chapman made his MLB debut with Oakland in 2017. He was traded to the Blue Jays prior to the 2022 season. He has won three Gold Glove Awards, two Platinum Glove Awards, and two Fielding Bible Awards. He also won the Wilson Defensive Player of the Year Award in 2018 and was an All-Star in 2019.

Career

Amateur career
Chapman attended El Toro High School in Lake Forest, California. In 2011, as a senior, he had a .422 batting average. Undrafted out of high school in the 2011 MLB draft, he enrolled at California State University, Fullerton where he played college baseball for the Cal State Fullerton Titans. In 2014, his junior year, he slashed .312/.412/.498 with six home runs and 48 runs batted in (RBIs) in 54 games. After the season, the Oakland Athletics selected Chapman in the first round of the 2014 MLB draft.

Professional career

Minor leagues
After signing, Chapman made his professional debut with the Rookie-level Arizona League Athletics. He was promoted to the Class-A Beloit Snappers after three games. In 50 games for Beloit, he batted .237 with five home runs and 20 RBIs. He also played in one game for the Double-A Midland RockHounds at the end of the season. His entire 2015 season was spent with the Class A-Advanced Stockton Ports where he batted .250 with 23 home runs and 57 RBIs in 80 games. Chapman was invited to major league spring training with the Athletics in 2016. He began the season with Midland, and after slashing .244/.335/.521 with 29 home runs and 83 RBIs in 117 games, was promoted to the Triple-A Nashville Sounds in August, where he finished the season batting .197 with seven home runs and 13 RBIs in 18 games. He was selected as the Texas League Player of the Year for 2016.

Chapman started the 2017 season playing for Nashville. He suffered a wrist injury on a check swing in the first series of the season and spent two weeks on the disabled list. In 49 games for Nashville, he batted .257 with 16 home runs and 30 RBIs.

Oakland Athletics
The Athletics promoted Chapman to the major league on June 15, 2017, to make his major league debut that night. On June 16, Chapman had his first major league hit and collected three RBIs (including the go-ahead run) against the New York Yankees. On September 6, Chapman was thrown out of a game by umpire Mike Everitt for arguing with Los Angeles Angels catcher Juan Graterol. Chapman took exception to Graterol staring at the Oakland batters, and Graterol felt that the Athletics were trying to steal signs. He spent the remainder of the season with Oakland after his June 15 call-up, batting .234 with 14 home runs and 40 RBIs in 84 games.

Chapman was placed on the disabled list on June 16, 2018, with a bruised right thumb and activated on July 3. Chapman finished his 2018 campaign batting .278 with 24 home runs and 68 RBIs, offering solid baserunning and excellent defense as well. He underwent ulnar sided sesamoid bone excision surgery on the thumb on October 16 in Los Angeles. On October 29, Chapman received a Fielding Bible Award. On November 4, Chapman received a Rawlings Gold Glove Award as well as winning the Rawlings Platinum Glove Award  with his former high school teammate Nolan Arenado. He also won the fan vote for the Platinum Glove Award. On December 14, 2018, Chapman underwent left shoulder surgery.

In 2019, Chapman excelled offensively, hitting 36 home runs with 91 RBI despite hitting .249/.342/.506 in 156 games as he struck out 147 times in 583 at bats.

On September 12, 2020, Chapman decided to opt out for the remainder of the season due to hip tendonitis that would require surgery.

In 2020, Chapman batted .232/.276/.535 with 10 home runs and 25 RBIs as he struck out 54 times in 142 at bats. He last played on September 6 due to hip tendonitis. He underwent labrum surgery that month, ending his season.

In 2021, Chapman batted .210/.314/.403 with 27 home runs and 72 RBIs in 151 games. He became the first Athletic to ever strike out 200 times in a season and had the lowest line drive percentage of any major leaguer, at 14.6%. He also took more pitches per plate appearance than any other MLB batter, at 4.29. He received his third career Gold Glove Award.

Toronto Blue Jays
On March 16, 2022, the Athletics traded Chapman to the Toronto Blue Jays for Gunnar Hoglund, Kevin Smith, Zach Logue, and Kirby Snead. On March 22, 2022, Chapman signed a two-year contract worth $25 million with the Blue Jays, avoiding salary arbitration.

Player profile
Chapman has a reputation of being an elite defender who has exceptional range, arm strength and arm accuracy. His arm strength allows him to play at a deeper depth to field a hard-hit ball heading down his right side. He uses a two-handed gather on forehand, and one-handed backhand with a basketball defensive crouch to prevent the ball from sailing.

Personal life
His former El Toro High School teammate is fellow MLB third baseman Nolan Arenado.

During the off-season, Chapman is roommates with Philadelphia Phillies catcher Garrett Stubbs in California.

Chapman and his wife Taylor were married in Cabo San Lucas, Mexico in December 2021.

References

External links

State Fullerton Baseball

1993 births
Living people
American League All-Stars
Arizona League Athletics players
Baseball players from California
Beloit Snappers players
Cal State Fullerton Titans baseball players
Gold Glove Award winners
Major League Baseball third basemen
Midland RockHounds players
Nashville Sounds players
Oakland Athletics players
People from Victorville, California
Stockton Ports players
Toronto Blue Jays players
La Crosse Loggers players